Chowni Sulehrian (also Chowni Sulehrian), is a medium-large village and municipality located within the Sialkot Tehsil of Sialkot District, in the Punjab province of Pakistan with a population of about 6,000. The village has its own government hospital as well as a private hospital, and an animal hospital for rural nearby villages. The village also contains facilities such as a post office. The Chowni Sulehrian village is located on Sialkot Pasrur Road opposite of Gold Panel Group Company. Postal Code 51310.

Villages in Sialkot District